Record is a common name for daily newspapers:

United States

Northeast

New York

 Times Herald-Record, formed from the (Middletown) Daily Record, Middletown, New York
 Columbia University Record
 The Record (Troy) (1896-present), Troy, New York

Boston

 The Boston Record (1884-1961), merged into the Record American and eventually the Boston Herald Boston Record-American The Boston News-letter, and City Record (1825-1826)

Pennsylvania

 The Philadelphia Record (1877-1947)
 The Public Record (1999-present), Philadelphia, Pennsylvania
 York Daily Record (1796-present), York, Pennsylvania

Other

 The Record (North Jersey)

South

 News & Record, formed from the Daily Record, Greensboro, North Carolina
 Times Record News (1907-present), Wichita Falls, Texas
 Columbia Record (1897-1988), Columbia, South Carolina

West
 The Record (Stockton, California) (1895-2013?)
 Daily Record (Washington)
 Chico Enterprise-Record'' (California)

Europe

 Record, a Portuguese sports newspaper

See also

 RecordTV
 Record News, Brazilian TV news channel

Record